Lem's Beat is an album by vibraphonist Lem Winchester's Sextet with saxophonist Oliver Nelson recorded in 1960 and released on the New Jazz label.

Reception

Scott Yanow of Allmusic states: "Nelson emerges as the most distinctive solo voice, and since he contributed three of the six songs, the tenorman's musical personality dominates this set. Winchester shows much potential that, due to his untimely death in early 1961, was never fulfilled. Good bop-based music".

Track listing 
All compositions by Oiver Nelson except where noted
 "Eddy's Dilemma" – 11:37
 "Lem & Aide" – 7:58
 "Friendly Persuasion" (Dimitri Tiomkin, Paul Francis Webster) – 4:08
 "Your Last Chance" – 6:50
 "Lady Day" (Roy Johnson) – 2:51
 "Just Friends" (John Klenner, Sam M. Lewis) – 5:17

Personnel 
Lem Winchester – vibraphone
Oliver Nelson – tenor saxophone, arranger
Curtis Peagler – alto saxophone
Billy Brown (tracks 1 & 4), Roy Johnson (tracks 2, 3, 5 & 6) – piano
Wendell Marshall – bass
Art Taylor – drums

References 

Lem Winchester albums
Oliver Nelson albums
1960 albums
Albums recorded at Van Gelder Studio
New Jazz Records albums
Albums produced by Esmond Edwards